Siddiqur Rahman Choudhury is a former secretary of finance of Bangladesh and Chairperson of Social Marketing Company. He is the former Chairman of Agrani Bank, Sadharan Bima Corporation, and Sonali Bank. He is Independent Director of MIDAS Financing Limited.

Early life 
Choudhury was born in 1949 in Sylhet District, East Pakistan, Pakistan. He completed his bachelors and masters in chemistry from the University of Dhaka. He also has a diploma from the University of Connecticut.

Career
In 1977, Choudhury joined the admin branch of the Bangladesh Civil Service. 

Choudhury was the secretary of the Finance Division of the Ministry of Finance in 2006 under M Saifur Rahman, Minister of Finance. That year he became the secretary of finance. In July 2006, he told the media that it will take some time to verify things before the funds requested by the Election Commission Secretariat was released. 

In 2007, as Chairman of Agrani Bank, Choudhury took steps to turn the bank into a public limited company. 

On 19 March 2014, Choudhury became an Independent Director of MIDAS Financing Limited. He is an independent director of National Housing Finance and Investments Limited. He served as team leader of SPFMSP Project of the Maxwell Stamp. He participated in a memorial event held in honor of former Finance minister M Saifur Rahman on 5 September 2015. 

Choudhury became the chairman of Social Marketing Company in September 2017 for a two-year term.Choudhury was reelected chairman of Social Marketing Company on 7 September 2019. Choudhury submitted the tax returns of Prime Minister Sheikh Hasina on 14 November 2019 on behalf of the prime minister.

References 

Living people
Bangladeshi civil servants
1949 births
People from Sylhet District
Bangladeshi bankers
University of Dhaka alumni